Hmong may refer to: 

 Hmong people, an ethnic group living mainly in Southwest China, Vietnam, Laos, and Thailand
 Hmong cuisine
 Hmong customs and culture
 Hmong music
 Hmong textile art
 Hmong language, a continuum of closely related tongues/dialects
 Hmong–Mien languages
 Pahawh Hmong, an indigenous semi-syllabic script
 Nyiakeng Puachue Hmong, a modern alphabetic script
 Hmong Americans, Americans of Hmong descent

See also
 Hmong folk religion
 Hmong in Wisconsin
 Hmong American Peace Academy
 Hmong Studies Journal
 Hong (disambiguation)
 Miao people
 Mong (disambiguation)

Language and nationality disambiguation pages